Dargida aleada is a species of cutworm or dart moth in the family Noctuidae. It is found in North America.

The MONA or Hodges number for Dargida aleada is 10435.

References

Further reading

 
 
 

Hadenini
Articles created by Qbugbot
Moths described in 1908